Louise Holcombe (born March 17, 1954 in Washington, D.C.) is a former American slalom canoeist who competed in the 1970s. She won a gold medal in the K-1 team event at the 1973 ICF Canoe Slalom World Championships in Muotathal.

Holcombe also finished 15th in the K-1 event at the 1972 Summer Olympics in Munich.

References

1954 births
Sportspeople from Washington, D.C.
American female canoeists
Canoeists at the 1972 Summer Olympics
Living people
Olympic canoeists of the United States
Medalists at the ICF Canoe Slalom World Championships
21st-century American women